Winged Cloud is an American English language visual novel developer.  They are known for creating the Sakura visual novel series, mainly of the adult genre.

History
Winged Cloud began releasing games on Steam in 2014, under publisher Sekai Project. Their first title, Sakura Spirit was released on July 9, 2014.  After publishing several of Winged Cloud's titles, Sekai Project and Winged Cloud ended their partnership.

Following this, in 2015 Winged Cloud partnered with publisher MangaGamer and released Sakura Santa.  However, in 2016 MangaGamer ended their partnership with Winged Cloud citing "intractable creative differences."

After leaving MangaGamer, Winged Cloud returned to their previous publisher Sekai Project, to release their next title, Sakura Dungeon.  Winged Cloud continued to release titles under Sekai Project, but in 2017, Sekai Project ended their partnership, and later released a statement stating that it was due to Winged Cloud's unprofessional behavior.  After separating from Sekai Project, Winged Cloud began publishing their titles independently.

Works

Games

Unreleased games

References

External links
 
 

Video game development companies
Video game companies of the United States